Ugyen Wangdi is a Bhutanese politician who is currently a Druk Phuensum Tshogpa (DPT) member of the National Assembly of Bhutan since October 2018. Previously he was member of the National Assembly from 2013 to 2018.

Political career
He was elected to the National Assembly as a candidate of DPT from Dramedtse Ngatshang constituency in 2013 Bhutanese National Assembly election. He received 4,164 votes and defeated Tshering Dorji, a candidate of PDP.

He was re-elected to the National Assembly as a candidate of DPT from Dramedtse Ngatshang constituency in the 2018 Bhutanese National Assembly election. He received 5,602 votes and defeated Jigme Dorji, a candidate of DNT.

Following his successful election, DPT nominated him for the office of Speaker of the National Assembly of Bhutan. He received 17 votes and lost the election to Wangchuk Namgyel who received 30 votes.

References

1969 births
Living people
Bhutanese MNAs 2018–2023
Druk Phuensum Tshogpa politicians
Bhutanese politicians
Bhutanese MNAs 2013–2018
Druk Phuensum Tshogpa MNAs